Jorge Elías Brito Hasbún (born 12 January 1990) is a Chilean politician who currently serves as a member of the Chamber of Deputies of his country.

References

External links
 BCN Profile

1990 births
Living people
Chilean people
21st-century Chilean politicians
Democratic Revolution politicians
Federico Santa María Technical University alumni